Thomas Neel Stilwell (August 29, 1830 – January 14, 1874) was an American lawyer, banker, and politician who served one term as a U.S. Representative from Indiana from 1865 to 1867.

Biography 
Born in Stillwell, Ohio, he attended Oxford and College Hill Colleges, where he studied law.
He was admitted to the bar in 1852 and began practice in Anderson, Indiana.

He served as member of the Ohio House of Representatives in 1856. He served in the 34th Indiana Infantry Regiment of the Union Army during the Civil War as a 1st Lieutenant and Regimental Quartermaster.

Congress 
Stilwell was elected as a Republican to the Thirty-ninth Congress (March 4, 1865 – March 3, 1867).

Later career and death 
He acted as Minister Resident to Venezuela in 1867 and 1868.
He served as president of the First National Bank of Anderson, Indiana, until his death.

He died in Anderson as the result of a gunshot wound January 14, 1874.
He was interred in Maplewood Cemetery.

References

External links 

1830 births
1874 deaths
19th-century American diplomats
Union Army officers
Republican Party members of the Indiana House of Representatives
Ambassadors of the United States to Venezuela
Deaths by firearm in Indiana
19th-century American politicians
Republican Party members of the United States House of Representatives from Indiana